Lima is a district of Lima Province in Peru. Lima district is the oldest in Lima Province and as such, vestiges of the city's colonial era remain today in the historic centre of Lima, which was declared a UNESCO World Heritage Site in 1988 and contains the foundational area known as Cercado de Lima (Spanish: "Walled Lima").

Geography

The district has a total land area of 21.98 km2. Its administrative center is located at 154 meters above sea level.

Boundaries
 North: The Rímac River marks the district's border with the San Martín de Porres and Rímac districts.
 East: El Agustino and San Juan de Lurigancho.
 South: La Victoria, Lince, Jesús María, Breña and Pueblo Libre.
 West: San Miguel District; and the Callao Region districts of Bellavista, Callao and Carmen de la Legua Reynoso.

Demographics

According to a 2005 estimate by the INEI, the district has 278,804 inhabitants and a population density of 15,736.9 persons/km2. In 1999, there were 75,595 households in the district.

The high point of Lima's religious calendar for the masses is a month of festivities in October dedicated to the Lord of Miracles, during which take place several processions in the city.

Neighborhoods
Central Lima (known as Cercado proper) is limited by Avenida Alfonso Ugarte on the west and Jirón Huánuco (Huánuco Street) on the east. It is divided into West and East sides by Jirón de la Unión (Union Street), from which cuadras (blocks) are numbered beginning at 100 and changing the first numbers at the next block. Unlike New York's Fifth Avenue, though, Jirón de la Unión is not paved for cars, but almost entirely a shopping and pedestrian street; the main thoroughfares for cars and buses are Tacna Ave. on the West side and Abancay Ave. on the East. Both are separated from Jirón de la Unión by 4 blocks. The Plaza de Armas (Grand Army Plaza), which is the main square, is located on block 2 of Jirón de la Unión, facing the Peruvian government palace and the Metropolitan Municipality of Lima (City Hall). It's also known as Damero de Pizarro (Pizarro's Checkerboard).

East of the center is the Barrios Altos (Uptown) neighborhood. Here the oldest, though least stable, buildings in Central Lima are located. Two cemeteries, El Ángel and Presbítero Maestro, form the eastern border with El Agustino. Parts of the long-demolished colonial city walls can be seen here. Abutting this to the southwest is the Barrio chino (Chinatown) neighborhood, dating from the mid-1800s.

South of the West Side is Santa Beatriz section, which contains residential buildings and the Parque de la Reserva. Santa Beatriz is locally famous for containing the buildings for the state TV network TNP (Ch. 7), and the top two private TV networks, America Television (Ch. 4) and Panamericana Television (Ch. 5). Its main thoroughfare is Arequipa Avenue, a narrow boulevard lined with trees of all sizes. Santa Beatriz is also home to the city (and country)'s main football stadium, the Estadio Nacional (National Stadium).

West of the center is the Industrial Area, an industrial belt extending into neighboring Callao Region, and home to the main industries in both city and country. Most of the area is covered by large blocks containing large factories. Also this area include the University City of the National University of San Marcos.

At its northern and southern edges, there are clusters of residential areas, particularly in the southern zone bordering Pueblo Libre, San Miguel and Callao Region's Bellavista District.

See also 
 Administrative divisions of Peru

Notes

References

External links

  Municipalidad Metropolitana de Lima - Metropolitan Lima Municipal Council official website

Districts of Lima
Central business districts
1535 establishments in the Spanish Empire

eo:Lima